Jossa is a village in the German municipality of Sinntal in Main-Kinzig-Kreis in the state of Hesse. Jossa lies within the Spessart nature park and is a state-recognised health resort. Its councillor is Günter Walther (2008).

Main-Kinzig-Kreis
Villages in Hesse